Vinyl ester refers to esters formally derived from vinyl alcohol. Commercially important examples of these monomers are  vinyl acetate, vinyl propionate, and vinyl laurate.

References

 
Monomers
Commodity chemicals